James Augustus Cotter Morison (20 April 1832 – 26 February 1888), was an English essayist and historian, born in London.

Early years
His father, who had made a large fortune as the inventor and proprietor of "Morison's Pills", settled in Paris till his death in 1840, and Cotter Morison thus acquired not only an acquaintance with the French language, but a profound sympathy with France and French institutions.

He was educated at Highgate School and Lincoln College, Oxford. Here he fell under the influence of Mark Pattison, to whom his impressionable nature perhaps owed a certain over-fastidiousness that characterised his whole career. He also made the acquaintance of the leading English Positivists, to whose opinions he became an ardent convert. Yet he retained a strong sympathy with the Roman Catholic religion, and at one time spent several weeks in a Catholic monastery.

Career
One other great influence appears in the admirable Life of St Bernard, which he published in 1863, that of his friend Carlyle, to whom the work is dedicated, and with whose style it is strongly coloured. Meanwhile, he had been a regular contributor, first to the Literary Gazette, edited by his friend John Morley, and then to the Saturday Review at its most brilliant epoch.

In 1868, he published a pamphlet entitled Irish Grievances shortly stated. In 1878, he published a volume on Gibbon in the Men of Letters series, marked by sound judgment and wide reading. This he followed up in 1882 with his Macaulay in the same series. It exhibits, more clearly perhaps than any other of Morison's works, both his merits and his defects.

Macaulay's bluff and strenuous character, his rhetorical style, his unphilosophical conception of history, were entirely out of harmony with Morison's prepossessions. Yet in his anxiety to do justice to his subject, he steeped himself in Macaulay until his style often recalls that which he is censuring. His brief sketch, Mme de Maintenon: une etude (1885), and some magazine articles, were the only fruits of his labours in French history.

Family
In 1861, Morison married Frances Virtue (d.1878), the daughter of publisher George Virtue. They had three children: Theodore Morison, a principal of Mohammedan Anglo-Oriental College from 1899 to 1905 which later on became Aligarh Muslim University and member of the Council of India from 1906; and daughters Helen Cotter, and Margaret.

Later life
In later life, he resided for some years in Paris, where his house was a meeting place for eminent men of all shades of opinion. Towards the close of his life, he meditated a work showing the application of positivist principles to conduct. Failing health compelled him to abandon the second or constructive part: the first, which attempts to show the ethical inadequacy of revealed religion and is marked in parts by much bitterness, was published in 1887 under the title of The Service of Man.

He died at his house in FitzJohn Avenue, London, on 26 February 1888.

References

Attribution

External links

 
 Gibbon
 
 

English essayists
19th-century English historians
Alumni of Lincoln College, Oxford
Members of the Council of India
Writers from London
1832 births
1888 deaths
People educated at Highgate School
English male non-fiction writers
British male essayists
19th-century essayists
19th-century English male writers